The Puerto Rican Basketball Federation ( or FBPR) is the governing body of basketball in Puerto Rico. As of October 18, 2021 the Puerto Rican men's national basketball team is ranked 19th in the world.

See also
 Puerto Rico men's national basketball team
 Puerto Rico women's national basketball team
 Puerto Rico men's national under-16 basketball team

References

External links 

Puerto
FBPR
Sports governing bodies in Puerto Rico
Basketball governing bodies in North America
Organizations based in San Juan, Puerto Rico
1957 establishments in Puerto Rico